The following is a select filmography of films for which Rahul Dev Burman (27 June 1939 – 4 January 1994), also known as R. D. Burman, composed the soundtracks.  He was one of the most prolific Indian movie score/soundtrack composers of the Indian film industry:

Bengali cinema

Hindi cinema

1960s

1970s

1980s

1990-1993

Posthumous releases: 1994-present
 1994: Janam Se Pehle
 1994: 1942: A Love Story (Won "Best Music Director" Award) 
 1996: Sautela Bhai
 1996: Ghatak
 1997: Anyay Hi Anyay
 1999: Zulmi (Only 1 Song)
 2000: Gang (Only 1 Song)
 2008: Yaar Meri Zindagi

Telugu cinema

R.D. Burman composed music for the following 2 Telugu cinema releases of the Tollywood film industry:

 1988: Chinni Krishnudu
 1990: Antham

Tamil cinema
R.D. Burman also composed music for the following 2 Tamil cinema releases of the Kollywood film industry:

 1987: Poo Mazhai Pozhiyuthu
 1990: Ulagam Pirandhadhu Enakkaga

SONGS FOR CHILDREN
 Aam Chum Taam Chum
 Lakdi Ki Kaathi
 Sare ke sare gama ko lekar
 Masterji ki aa gayee chitthi

Unreleased songs
 Not Available (1974)
 "Happy Christmas to you" - Kishore Kumar, Lata Mangeshkar
 "Sab Se Pehle Sab Se Aakhir, Loon Main Tera Naam, Hey Ram" - Lata Mangeshkar, Mohammed Rafi

 Aar Paar 2 (1978)
 "Humse Ka Puchhat Ho Bhai" - Kishore Kumar

 Bebus (1978)
 "Pyaar Jab Kiya To" - Kishore Kumar, Asha Bhosle

 Kharidaar (1978)

 Devdas (1978)
 "Kuhu Kuhu Koyaliya" - Lata Mangeshkar
 "Sehma Sehma Dara Sa" - Bhupinder Singh

 Mezaan (1978)

 Mr Hasmukh (1978)
 "Jo Hoga Dekha Jaayega Aao Hum Tum Pyar Karein" - Kishore Kumar, Asha Bhosle

 Nazrana (1978)
 "Ek Roz Mujhe Poochha Kisine" - Asha Bhosle

 Production No. 1 (1978)
 "Are Aao Dekho Dekho" - Lata Mangeshkar

 Sone Ki Lanka (1978)

 Khwaaish (1980)
 "Jab Se Basa Hai Dil Mein Tu Kaisa Kiya Hai Jaadu" - Kishore Kumar, Asha Bhosle
 "Shaam Se Aankh Mein" - Lata Mangeshkar

 Not Available (1980)
 "Haan Haan Aaj Main Kuch Kehenewala Hoon" - Mohammed Rafi, Lata Mangeshkar

 Reshma O Reshma (1980)
 "Khushi Key Saath Chale" - Lata Mangeshkar, Usha Mangeshkar
 "Le Chal Kahin Mujhko" - Asha Bhosle

 Dushman Dost (1981)

 Abhi Abhi (1984)

 Sab Se Bada Paap (1984)
 "Shyam Suno Meri Binati" - Asha Bhosle
 "Teri Nazar Meri Nazar" - Asha Bhosle, Mohammed Aziz

 Jab Pyar Humari (1985)
 "Is Duniya Mrinmoy The" - Kishore Kumar, Asha Bhosle

 Jaan-E-Jaana (1988)

 Tadap Aisi Bhi Hoti Hain (1988)

 Zanjeeren (1988)
 "Diya Diya Dil Diya" - Kavita Krishnamurthy

 Jeevan Saat Suron Ka Sangam (1989)
 "Ganga Jamuna Se Door" - Sadhana Sargam
 "Yeh Jeevan Saat During Ka Sangam" - Kumar Sanu

 Time Limit (1989)
 "Aji Ruko To Zara" - Amit Kumar, Asha Bhosle
 "Barso Re Barso Re" - Anuradha Paudwal, Shailendra Singh
 "Pinky Darling" - Amit Kumar

References

External links

http://www.panchamonline.com/

Burman, Rahuldev